Abdulrahman Ahmed Abdullah Al-Obaid (born 30 April 1993) is a Saudi Arabian professional footballer who plays as a left-back for Al-Ettifaq on loan from Al-Hilal.

Career statistics

Club

International
Statistics accurate as of match played 19 November 2019.

Honours
Al-Qadsiah
First Division: 2014–15

Al-Nassr
Pro League: 2018–19
Saudi Super Cup: 2019, 2020

Al-Hilal
Pro League: 2021–22

References

External links
 

Living people
1993 births
People from Khobar
Saudi Arabian footballers
Saudi Arabia youth international footballers
Saudi Arabia international footballers
Al-Qadsiah FC players
Al Nassr FC players
Al Hilal SFC players
Ettifaq FC players
Saudi First Division League players
Saudi Professional League players
Association football fullbacks